John Waterman Okey (January 3, 1827 – July 25, 1885) was a judge and legal author in the U.S. State of Ohio who was an Ohio Supreme Court Judge 1878–1885. He was a member of the Democratic Party

Okey was born in Monroe County, Ohio near Woodsfield. He attended the Monroe Academy. He studied law at Woodsfield, and became Probate Judge and Judge of Common Pleas.

In 1865, Okey moved to Cincinnati, and with Judge Gholson he wrote Gholson and Okey's Digest of Ohio Reports. He also authored Okey and Miller's Municipal Law with S. A. Miller.

In 1877, Okey defeated Republican William Wartenbee Johnson for election to the Ohio Supreme Court. In 1882, he defeated John H. Doyle for re-election. He died July 25, 1885. He was buried at Spring Grove Cemetery in Cincinnati, Ohio.

Okey was married to Mary J. Bloor in Woodsfield in 1849. They raised two sons and two daughters.

See also
List of justices of the Ohio Supreme Court

Notes

References

Burials at Spring Grove Cemetery
Ohio lawyers
Ohio Democrats
Justices of the Ohio Supreme Court
People from Woodsfield, Ohio
Lawyers from Cincinnati
1827 births
1885 deaths
19th-century American judges
19th-century American lawyers